Las Mantenidas Sin Sueños is the original soundtrack from Vera Fogwill's movie Las Mantenidas Sin Sueños (entitled Kept and Dreamless for international audiences), released in 2007. It was composed in its entirety by the Argentine band Babasónicos in the year 2003, but its release was delayed until the presentation of the movie in Argentina, which finally premiered in April 2007.

"Las Mantenidas", "Mantel Bucólico" and "Rápido y Juntos" are the only songs with vocals; the rest are either short instrumentals or variations on one of these songs, with the exception of "Las Fantasmas", an instrumental track mixed with dialogue from the movie.

Track listing
 "Insomnio" (Insomnia) – 1:49
 "Las Mantenidas" (The Kept) – 2:47
 "Mantel Bucólico – Piano" (Bucolic Table Cloth – Piano) – 1:44
 "Llegar a Nada" (Arrive to Nothing) – 0:40
 "Chau Puerta" (Bye Door) – 0:39
 "Mantel Bucólico" (Bucolic Table Cloth) – 3:08
 "Azúcar" (Sugar) – 0:34
 "Las Mantenidas – Piden Pista" (The Kept – Preparing for Takeoff) – 1:59
 "Las Fantasmas" (The Phantoms) – 3:06
 "Mantel Bucólico – Versión Flora" (Bucolic Table Cloth – Flora Version) – 1:20
 "Rápido y Juntos" (Quickly and Together) – 2:12

Babasónicos albums
2007 soundtrack albums
Film soundtracks